Coalla is one of 28 parishes (administrative divisions) in the municipality of Grado, within the province and autonomous community of Asturias, in northern Spain. 

The population is 144 (INE 2007).

Villages and hamlets
 La Asniella (L'Asniella)
 Baselgas
 Carroceda
 Coalla (Cuáya)
 Coallajú (Cuainxú)
 Loredo (Llauréu)
 Las Murias
 Panicera
 Pumarín
 Villar

References

Parishes in Grado